In mathematics, the concept of a generalised metric is a generalisation of that of a metric, in which the distance is not a real number but taken from an arbitrary ordered field.

In general, when we define metric space the distance function is taken to be a real-valued function. The real numbers form an ordered field which is Archimedean and order complete. These metric spaces have some nice properties like: in a metric space compactness, sequential compactness and countable compactness are equivalent etc. These properties may not, however, hold so easily if the distance function is taken in an arbitrary ordered field, instead of in

Preliminary definition

Let  be an arbitrary ordered field, and  a nonempty set; a function  is called a metric on  if the following conditions hold:

  if and only if ;
  (symmetry);
  (triangle inequality).

In view of the fact that  in its order topology is monotonically normal, we would expect  to be at least regular.

Further properties

However, under axiom of choice, every general metric is monotonically normal, for, given  where  is open, there is an open ball  such that  Take  Verify the conditions for Monotone Normality.

The matter of wonder is that, even without choice, general metrics are monotonically normal.

proof.

Case I:  is an Archimedean field.

Now, if  in   open, we may take  where  and the trick is done without choice.

Case II:  is a non-Archimedean field.

For given  where  is open, consider the set

The set  is non-empty.

Now define  We would show that with respect to this mu operator, the space is monotonically normal. Note that 

If not, say  is in the intersection. Then

This completes the proof.

See also

External links

 

Metric geometry
Norms (mathematics)
Topology